Jaime Torres may refer to:

Jaime Torres Bodet (1902–1974), Mexican politician and intellectual, director-general of UNESCO
Jaime Torres (musician) (1938–2018), Argentine charango musician